12 'O' Clock is a 2021 Indian Hindi-language horror film directed by Ram Gopal Varma and starring Mithun Chakraborty, Flora Saini, Manav Kaul, Krishna Gautam and Makarand Deshpande. The film was first announced with the name Geher, but the following trailer revealed it had been renamed 12 'O' Clock on 3 July 2020. It was released to the public in India on 8 January 2021.

Plot
The film opens with the murder of a pedestrian by an old lady at night which remains unresolved. The plot then moves to Gauri's family, comprising her father Rao, mother, brother and grandmother. Gauri is shown to sleepwalk and act strangely at night time.

Unexplained murders continue to happen in the city, including two policemen, leaving the police baffled. Gauri becomes quiet and withdrawn and often experiences hallucinations.
She is taken to  a doctor who is not able to cure her, then to a tantrik who says she is possessed and tries to exercise her by beating her to which her parents object. 

Rao visits psychiatrist Dr Debashish, who says Gauri has dissociated personality and can be treated. One doctor who treats Gauri and his assistant nurse are murdered too. Gauri begins to talk in a manly voice and tells her parents that she is the one who committed the murders in the city. Rao sends his son and mother to their village for safety. 

Rao then goes to the police, and inspector Francis, at first dismissive of his statement, then goes to visit Gauri himself. Gauri continues to speak in a manly voice and it is revealed that she is possessed by Babu,the spirit of a psycho killer who was encounter killed by the police a year back, and who possessed Gauri as she passed by a cemetery where he was interred. Francis was the policeman who killed Babu. A shocked Francis goes to his superior commissioner who assigns him leave and rubbishes the claims. Francis later kills his wife and shoots himself, apparently possessed by a spirit.

Debashish is called to visit Gauri but is also shocked when Babu speaks to him in the voice of his dying mother. Commisioner and Debashish meet Babu and are not able to deny the reality now. Babu says he will never leave Gauri's body and will continue to commit murders, with the help of other spirits who committed the other murders in the city on his behalf. The exorcist is approached again and he tells them that there is darkness beyond the light and educated people see only the light, before he too apparently becomes possessed by a spirit and gets killed.

Left with no choice, and the concern that the media will never believe claims of supernatural powers, everyone decides that Gauri must be killed for Babu's spirit to be eliminated before more murders occur. Rao and his wife enter the house, distract Babu and immolate Gauri, with Debashish and commisioner watching.

The film ends with Debashish writing to his daughter, describing this paranormal incident, saying that there is more to everything that rational thinking and the supernatural does exists.

Cast

Mithun Chakraborty as Debu
Krishna Gautam as Gauri
Flora Saini as Maya D'Souza, D'Souza's wife 
Manav Kaul as Encounter Specialist Francis D'Souza
Makarand Deshpande as Rao
Divya Jagdale as Gauri's mother
Ashish Vidyarthi as Baba
Ali Asgar as Doctor
Dalip Tahil as Commissioner

Production
As Mithun Chakraborty visited Ram Gopal Varma to wish him on his birthday, rumours surfaced that RGV is making a film with Chakraborty in the lead, but RGV rubbished the rumours saying he is making a film with Abhishek Bachchan after Sarkar 3, but weeks later he announced the project with Chakraborty, a horror film starring Flora Saini, Manav Kaul and Makarand Deshpande as well. Actor Amit Sadh was also in consideration for a role. The principal photography of the film started in mid-April 2019. Actors Ashish Vidyarthi and Ali Asgar joined the project later.

Reception 

Archika Khurana of The Times of India gave the film, a rating of 2 out of 5 and stated "If you get spooked easily, you may not mind this one. However, as a psychological thriller that's focussed on ‘one’s believes in supernatural activities only when they have faced themselves’, ’12 ‘o' Clock’ fails to hold your attention for too long and ends up being a bit of a drag."

References

External links 
 

2021 films
2020s Hindi-language films
Indian horror films
Films directed by Ram Gopal Varma
2021 horror films
Hindi-language horror films